Anna Bannanas Cafe, or simply Anna Bannanas, is a coffee shop in Portland, Oregon's Northwest District, in the United States. Previously, the business had locations in north and northeast Portland.

Description and history 
There have been three locations: the original restaurant on 21st Avenue in northwest Portland's Northwest District, another in north Portland's St. Johns neighborhood, and another on Alberta Street in northeast Portland's Vernon neighborhood. The original restaurant opened in 1994, and the St. Johns location opened in 2006. The Alberta restaurant closed in 2014.

Reception
In 2015, Pete Cottell of Willamette Week included Anna Bannanas in the "dive" category of "Where to Coffice in Portland". Jordan Michelman included the cafe in the newspaper's 2016 list of "Five Essential Old-School Portland Cafes". Willamette Week also included Anna Bannanas in a 2017 list of "The Best Secret Nooks and Hidey-Holes in Portland Cafes".

References

External links 

 
 
 Anna Bannanas at Zomato

1994 establishments in Oregon
Coffee in Portland, Oregon
Northwest District, Portland, Oregon
Restaurants established in 1994
Restaurants in Portland, Oregon
St. Johns, Portland, Oregon
Vernon, Portland, Oregon